Angelo Ziccardi (1 May 1928 –  6 January 2019) was an Italian politician who served as a Senator between 1972 and 1983.

References

1928 births
2019 deaths
People from Irsina
Italian politicians